Egidio Quinto (2 April 1653 – 1 June 1722) served as an archbishop of Antivari in the early 18th century.

Quinto was appointed Bishop of Sappa on 21 March 1707. He was later appointed as Archbishop of Antivari by Pope Clement XI on 8 February 1719.

References 
 Catholic Hierarchy: Archbishop Egidio Quinto

1653 births
1722 deaths
Archbishops of Antivari
18th-century Roman Catholic archbishops in the Republic of Venice
18th-century Roman Catholic bishops in the Ottoman Empire